The Metropolitan Swimming Conference (METS) is one of the largest intercollegiate swimming and diving conferences in the United States. It includes NCAA division I, II, & III teams from the New York metropolitan region. Teams compete at an annual 3-day conference championship held at Rutgers University, New Brunswick, New Jersey in February. For the men, The College of New Jersey has captured the last 8 conference titles from 2007 through 2014. The LIU Post women have captured the previous two titles in 2013 and 2014.

Affiliated University Teams

Current members

Former members

See also

List of college athletic conferences in the United States

External links
 

NCAA conferences
College swimming in the United States
Sports in the New York metropolitan area